Lostman Go to Budokan is a live performance video by Japanese alternative rock band The Pillows on September 16, 2009 at Nippon Budokan.The event marks the band's 20th anniversary (The Pillows started their career on September 16, 1989).It's their first performance at Budokan.

Track listing
 Thank you my twilight
 MY FOOT
 No Surrender
 Another Morning
 Wake up! dodo
 Propose
 Scarecrow
 New Animal
 90's MY LIFE
 Boku wa kakera
 ONE LIFE
 1989
 Sullivan ni naritai
 Ladybird girl
 Funny Bunny
 I know you
 Strange Chameleon
 The Third Eye
 Konoyo no Hate Made
 Sono mirai wa Ima
 Ame Agari ni Mita Maboroshi
 Hybryd Rainbow
 Please Mr.Lostman
 Swanky Street
 Calvero
 Ride on shooting star
 LITTLE BUSTERS
 POISON ROCK'N'ROLL

The Pillows video albums
Live video albums
2009 video albums
Albums recorded at the Nippon Budokan